Simon Charles Cowling (born 1959) has been  Dean of Wakefield since 2018.

Education

Cowling was educated at Gonville and Caius College, Cambridge, King’s College London and Lincoln Theological College. He was a teacher until his ordination in 1992.

Ministry

He served curacies at St Martin, Potternewton, Leeds from 1991 to 1994 and at St Chad, Far Headingley, Leeds from 1994 to 1996; and was Vicar at St Edmund King and Martyr, Roundhay from  1996 to 2007. He was Area Dean of Allerton from  2004 to 2007; Canon Residentiary and Precentor of Sheffield Cathedral from 2007 to 2013; and Rector of Bolton Priory from 2013 until his appointment as dean.

References

External links
 Wakefield Express
 youtube

1959 births
Living people
Alumni of King's College London
Alumni of Gonville and Caius College, Cambridge
Alumni of Lincoln Theological College
Provosts and Deans of Wakefield
Schoolteachers from Essex
Church of England priests
20th-century English Anglican priests
21st-century English Anglican priests